Mick Glossop is an English record producer and recording engineer. In 2009, he was awarded a Visiting Professorship at Leeds College of Music.

Glossop was initially known for recording and producing for new wave and punk bands such as Magazine, Public Image Ltd, the Ruts, the Skids and Penetration, but also had success working with many other artists, including roots reggae artist Delroy Washington, Kevin Coyne, the Waterboys, Furniture, the Wonder Stuff, Frank Zappa, Paul Brady, Ian Gillan, RiTA, John Lee Hooker and Lloyd Cole.

Since 1986, he has worked extensively with Van Morrison and for whom he has recorded and/or mixed 17 albums.

Glossop was one of the original designers and chief engineer of Manor Studios and The Town House.

In 2000, Glossop was featured in the book Behind the Glass by Howard Massey.

In 2010, he was presented with the Music Producers Guild (UK) awards for Recording Engineer of the Year and Live Album of the Year.

In May 2012, Glossop revealed he was working on new albums with Sebastopol and Phil "Swill" Odgers.

References

External links
Mick Glossop's website
Pro Tools Expert, Interview with Mick Glossop, 15 Oct 2009
Behind The Glass: Top Record Producers Tell How They Craft the Hits by Howard Massey (Backbeat Books, 2000) on Amazon

Living people
English record producers
English audio engineers
Year of birth missing (living people)